Amygdalohippocampectomy is a surgical procedure for the treatment of epilepsy. It consists of the removal of the hippocampus, which has a role in memory, spatial awareness, and navigation, and the amygdalae, which have a role in the processing and memory of emotional reactions, both structures forming part of the limbic system of the brain.

Amygdalohippocampectomy is used only when all other treatment options have failed to resolve the epilepsy. It is an effective treatment for most patients. However, possible adverse side effects include impaired memory and defects in visual perception.


Procedure 

The amygdalohippocampectomy is indicated when the focal point of the seizures can be anatomically localized to the hippocampus and amygdala. Normally, to be considered for this procedure, one must have failed all first-line treatments.

The selective amygdalohippocampectomy will remove only the offending portions of the hippocampus and amygdala. When data from studies of the electrophysiology and neuropathy vis-à-vis temporal lobe epilepsy determines this area to be the origin of seizure activity, the removal of the hippocampus and amygdala is usually indicated. Computer imaging is sometimes used to guide this procedure. Patients continue normal activity after approximately six to eight weeks.

Statistics and side effects 
Of 376 patients who had the amygdalohippocampectomy procedure performed, compared to other types of temporal lobe resections, two thirds of this population were reported free of disabling seizures.
Some patients report defects in visual perception and impaired memory function.

References 

Epilepsy
Surgical removal procedures
Neurosurgical procedures
Hippocampus (brain)
Amygdala